Opekkha is a 2010 Bangladeshi drama film written and directed by Abu Sayeed (Film Director). It starring Mirana Zaman, Jayanta Chattopadhyay, Tinu Karim, Uzzal Mahmud, Mithu Borman, Sharif.

Plot
Rabiul and Ranju are two young men of two different districts of Bangladesh. Rabiul stays in Dhaka for his passion for singing. He was brought up by his grandmother who is his only relative living in village. Grandma writes letters regularly to him. Rabiul's grandmother has problems with her memory.
Ranju studies at a college. Despite Ranju becomes a member of an Islamic militant group. He mounts a bomb attack in Dhaka which kills Rabiul and others. Parents of Ranju come to know the fact and the revelation comes as a shock to them..... Grandma forgets death of Rabiul and begins writing letters again and continues her eternal waiting at the village bus-stop for her grandson to return. Parents also continue their eternal search for their son to come back.

Award
 Best Director, Best Actor, Best Actress, Meril-Prothom Alo Critics Award, 2010.

Festival participation 
 Official Selection, Kazan International Film Festival
 Official selection, Bangalore International Film Festival  
 Official selection, Third Eye Asian Film Festival 
 Official selection, Chicago South Asian Film Festival
 Official selection, Chennai International Film Festival

References

 http://archive.thedailystar.net/newDesign/news-details.php?nid=168993
 http://archive.prothom-alo.com/detail/date/2010-03-30/news/52528

Bengali-language Bangladeshi films
2010s Bengali-language films
Films directed by Abu Sayeed (film director)
Films whose writer won the Best Screenplay National Film Award (Bangladesh)